Julius Wakachu (born 1 January 1948) is a Tanzanian long-distance runner. He competed in the marathon at the 1972 Summer Olympics.

References

1948 births
Living people
Athletes (track and field) at the 1972 Summer Olympics
Tanzanian male long-distance runners
Tanzanian male marathon runners
Olympic athletes of Tanzania
Place of birth missing (living people)